Lawrence Alexander Izzo (born September 26, 1974) is an American professional football coach and former player who is the special teams coordinator for the Seattle Seahawks of the National Football League (NFL). He played as a linebacker and special teamer in the NFL. He played college football for the Rice Owls, and was signed by the Miami Dolphins as an undrafted free agent in 1996. A three-time Pro Bowl selection and three-time All-Pro selection, Izzo has also played for the New England Patriots. He won three Super Bowls during his time with the Patriots and one as an assistant special teams coordinator for the New York Giants.

Early years
Izzo attended Broad Run High School in Ashburn, Virginia for his Freshman and Sophomore year.  As a sophomore, he started as a linebacker and running back, becoming the first sophomore in school history to lead the team in rushing yards and TDs. When his family relocated to Texas, he attended  McCullough High School in The Woodlands, Texas, and won two varsity letters in football where he was coached by Weldon Willig as a running back/safety, as well as baseball. During his senior year, Izzo led McCullough with 1,081 yards rushing, while totaling 131 tackles for the Texas 5A semi-finalists.  He was selected as the Houston Chronicles Two-Way Player of the Year, and was a finalist for the Houston Touchdown Club's Player of the Year.

College career
Izzo attended Rice University, where he wore the number 26, and was a four-year letterman and standout and finished fourth on the school's all-time tackles list with 301 tackles, setting a school-record 46 tackles for losses, and a season record of 18 tackles for losses in 1995.

In 1994 an underdog Rice beat top 10 ranked Texas on national television by the score of 19–17, as Izzo was selected player of the game with two key sacks (sharing the honor with teammate N. D. Kalu). It was the first time in over 30 years that Rice had beaten its in-state rival, and would help Rice win a share of the Southwest Conference title for the first time in 37 years.

As a senior, Izzo was voted defensive team captain and earned consensus All-Southwest Conference honors after registering 121 tackles, he won the George Martin Award as the team's MVP and won the Jess Neely Defense Award as the team's top linebacker. Izzo was also selected as an Honorable Mention All-American.

Professional career

Miami Dolphins
Izzo went undrafted in the 1996 NFL Draft and was later signed by the Miami Dolphins as a free agent in April 1996. He first came to local notoriety based on a sound byte that circulated during the pre-season of Izzo's rookie year, where Miami coach Jimmy Johnson told the team that only two players were guaranteed to make the team: one was Dan Marino and the other the then-unknown Izzo. He spent most of his time on special teams, and was rewarded with his first trip to the Pro Bowl in 2000.

New England Patriots
Izzo signed with Miami's divisional rival New England Patriots in 2001, and played on three of the six Patriots' Super Bowl championship teams (2001, 2003 and 2004), defeating the St. Louis Rams, Carolina Panthers, and Philadelphia Eagles, respectively. Izzo was also part of the 2007 Patriots, who were the only undefeated team in the regular season since the NFL expanded to a 16-game schedule; they lost Super Bowl XLII, 17–14, to the New York Giants. He also had two more trips to Hawaii as the AFC special team representative in 2002, and 2004. Izzo gained notoriety in 2002 in the Patriots Super Bowl parade by leading the crowd in a "Yankees suck!" chant, in reference to the Yankees–Red Sox rivalry.

In 2008, Izzo hosted an interview segment on the NESN dating show Sox Appeal.

New York Jets
Izzo joined his third AFC East team, the New York Jets on March 11, 2009.  On December 10, 2009, the Jets placed Izzo on IR after tests revealed a spine injury.

Coaching career

New York Giants (2011–2015)
On June 24, 2011, Izzo joined the New York Giants as assistant special teams coach. Izzo was credited with helping turn around the Giants special teams during their Super Bowl run in 2011-12. In the pivotal 2011-12 NFC Championship game, the Giant's special teams changed the momentum of the game when rookie linebacker Jacquian Williams caused a fumble on a punt return to set up Lawrence Tynes' game-winning field goal in overtime against the 49ers. The Giants went on to win the Super Bowl, and Izzo received his fourth Super Bowl ring.

Houston Texans (2016–2017)
On January 15, 2016, the Houston Texans hired Izzo as special teams coordinator. During Izzo's tenure with Houston the Special Teams unit improved its DVOA ranking from dead last (ranked 32 in 2015) to 26 in 2017, including finishing in the top 10 in two critical statistical areas related to coverage teams (Opponent Kickoff Return Average and Net Punt Average, which was 41.3 yds). On January 2, 2018 Texans reached a mutual parting of the ways with Izzo.

Seattle Seahawks (2018–present)
On February 1, 2018, the Seattle Seahawks hired Izzo as assistant special teams coach.

On September 11, 2020, Izzo became the interim special teams coordinator for the Seahawks after their coordinator Brian Schneider left the team indefinitely due to personal reasons; Izzo subsequently led the Seahawks into the top 3 for Special Teams DVOA rankings. He was promoted to full-time special teams coordinator on March 3, 2021.

During the 2021 season, Izzo's second full season as Special Teams Coordinator, Seattle's special teams ranked as the third strongest unit in the league by SIs Rick Gosselin

Accomplishments
 In 14 NFL seasons, Izzo recorded more special teams tackles than any other NFL player in history (298).  Izzo racked up 275 ST Tackles in 200 career regular-season games plus 23 tackles in 21 postseason games.  While the NFL does not publish official statistics on ST tackles, that ranks Izzo ahead of Buffalo's Mark Pike (283). He also ranks ahead of Keith Burns (231), Gary Stills (218), former Dallas Cowboy Bill Bates (216) and former Bill Steve Tasker (186).
 In 14 NFL seasons, Izzo never played on a team with a losing record.  That included 9 playoff appearances, 5 AFC Championship appearances, 4 Super Bowl appearances, and 3 Super Bowl victories.
 Izzo was the Miami Dolphins recipient of the Ed Block Courage Award in 1998, following his recovery from a season-ending achilles tendon injury.* * Izzo recorded his highest special teams tackle total in 1999 when he led the Dolphins with 33 special teams stops. In 2003, he tallied 31 special teams tackles to lead the Patriots.
 As a Miami Dolphin, Larry Izzo was Named to Football Digest's 1999 All-Tough Guy Team.
 Izzo was named to ESPN's John Clayton's "The Best Team Money Can Buy" roster in July 2006 as a back-up linebacker and special teams coverage player.
 Izzo played in 103 consecutive games for the Patriots (2000-2008).
 In 2008, Izzo was selected by his teammates as special teams captain of the New England Patriots for the 8th consecutive season.
 Was awarded a game ball by Bill Belichick for managing to defecate on the sideline of an NFL game without anyone noticing.
 In 2020, the New England Patriots Hall of Fame named Larry Izzo to their all-dynasty team.
 In 2021, Tom Curran from NBC Sports/Patriots Insider named Larry Izzo to the list of "Top 50 Patriots of the Belichick era".

Community activism
 For his charity work and community activism, Izzo was honored by Bob Kraft and the New England Patriots Organization with the Ron Burton Community Service Award at the team's annual Kickoff Gala in August 2008.  To date, his Larryoke events have raised over $600,000 for U.S. Military veterans and their families.
 Izzo represented the NFL during a 2005 "The USO and NFL Salute the Troops Tour," which visited soldiers in Afghanistan and Iraq. During the tour, Izzo and Warrick Dunn officially opened the USO Pat Tillman Center at Bagram, a center that serves thousands of troops transitioning to and from Kuwait, Qatar, Iraq and Europe.
 In October 2006, Izzo hosted a charity event in Boston "Karaoke with Larry Izzo and the New England Patriots." The 2nd annual event raised over $200,000 for charities which included The Intrepid Fallen Heroes Fund, Operation Ensuring Christmas, the USO of New England, and Fallen Patriot. Participating at the fundraiser over the past two years were celebrities and athletes including Mark Cuban, Tom Brady, and other members of the New England Patriots.
 While at the 2002 Pro Bowl, Izzo visited 8,500 crew members aboard the USS Carl Vinson at Pearl Harbor, and the ship left the next day to participate in Operation Enduring Freedom.
 In October 2008, Izzo spoke at the Light the Night Walk in Boston, a charity walk that benefits the Leukemia & Lymphoma Society

Personal life
Izzo and his wife Mara were married on February 21, 2004.

References

Sportspeople from Fairfax County, Virginia
Houston Texans coaches
New York Giants coaches
Seattle Seahawks coaches
American football linebackers
Rice Owls football players
Miami Dolphins players
New England Patriots players
New York Jets players
American Conference Pro Bowl players
1974 births
Living people
Players of American football from Virginia
People from The Woodlands, Texas
Players of American football from Texas
Sportspeople from Harris County, Texas
People from Fort Belvoir, Virginia
People from Ashburn, Virginia
Ed Block Courage Award recipients